Tongxiao Township is an urban township in southern Miaoli County, Taiwan. It lies between the Taiwan Strait on the west and mountains on the east.

History
The town was formerly called Thunsiau.

Geography
Area: 
 Population: 31,799 (January 2023 estimate)

Administrative divisions
The township comprises 24 villages: Baitung, Baixi, Chengbei, Chengnan, Fengshu, Fulong, Fuxing, Fuyuan, Meinan, Nanhe, Neidao, Neihu, Pingan, Pingding, Pingyuan, Tongnan, Tongtung, Tongwan, Tongxi, Wubei, Wumei, Wunan, Xinpu and Zuntou.

Politics
The township is part of Miaoli County Constituency I electoral district for Legislative Yuan.

Tourist attractions

 Flying Cow Ranch
 Gongtian Temple
 Taiyen Tongxiao Tourism Factory
 Tongxiao Beach Resort
 Tongxiao Electrodialysis Salt Factory
 Tongxiao Jinja
 Tongxiao Shrine
 Baishatun Mazu Pilgrimage

Transportation

 TRA Baishatun Station
 TRA Tongxiao Station
 TRA Xinpu Station
Taiwan High Speed Rail passes through the central part of the township, but no station is currently planned.

Notable natives
 Ju Ming, sculptor

References

External links

  

Townships in Miaoli County
Taiwan placenames originating from Formosan languages